Oldřichov refers to the following places in the Czech Republic:

 Oldřichov (Přerov District)
 Oldřichov (Tábor District)
 Nový Oldřichov